The 2010 FIBA World Championship Final was a basketball game between the men's national teams of Turkey and the United States that took place on September 12, 2010, at Sinan Erdem Dome in Istanbul, Turkey, to determine the winner of the 2010 FIBA World Championship. The US team won the world title after defeating Turkey 81–64.

This was the first match-up in any major international competition between the United States and Turkey. The last time the two teams faced each other in a match was at an exhibition game before the 2008 Summer Olympics. At that meeting, the U.S. won 114–82.

Route to the final
Both teams qualified to the tournament automatically, the U.S. by winning the gold medal at the Olympics in Beijing, and Turkey as hosts.
Historically, the teams were polar opposites. America had 16 Summer Olympics medals and 10 FIBA World Cup medals, while Turkey's only previous international medal of any kind was a silver at the EuroBasket 2001.  The US brought the top scoring offense into the final, averaging 94.3 points and 18.5 assists per game.  Nevertheless, Turkey's vaunted 2–1–2 zone made it the top defensive team (64 points per game) in the tournament heading into the final, and a commentator on NBA.com wrote that the European crowd would "be the most hostile crowd most of these [U.S.] players, with the exception of maybe Chauncey Billups and Lamar Odom, have ever seen."

The U.S. had an easier route to the final, winning all of their games in runaway fashion, with the sole exception of their preliminary round game against Brazil. Turkey, on the other hand, had close games against Puerto Rico in the preliminary round, and against Serbia in the semifinals, in which Kerem Tunçeri scored the go-ahead basket, with less than a second left, after picking up Hedo Türkoğlu's fumble, to give Turkey the 83–82 win. Both teams were undefeated going into the final.

Match details
The game was close for the first half — Turkey even led at one point during the first quarter — but the American athleticism was too much for the Turks, and the U.S. was able to pull away on easy baskets.

Kevin Durant was the game's leading scorer, with 28 points, including seven three-point field goals. Durant scored 20 of his points in the first half. Lamar Odom came up big when it mattered most, scoring all fifteen of his points in the second half, and grabbing eleven rebounds overall.  Hedo Türkoğlu was Turkey's leading scorer with 16 points, despite suffering a knee injury during the first half.  Ersan İlyasova had seven points and eleven rebounds.

With the win, Mike Krzyzewski became the first U.S. national basketball head coach to win an Olympic Gold Medal and a FIBA World Cup.  The U.S. also clinched an automatic berth in the 2012 Summer Olympics.

References

External links
 
 

Final
Turkey national basketball team games
United States national basketball team games
Sports competitions in Istanbul
Turkey–United States relations
FIBA Basketball World Cup Finals
Final
Final
September 2010 sports events in Turkey
Sport in Bakırköy